Caloptilia pseudoaurita is a moth of the family Gracillariidae. It is known from Ghana and Nigeria.

References

pseudoaurita
Insects of West Africa
Moths of Africa
Moths described in 1989